= Graduate assistant =

Support personnel at college level

A graduate assistant serves in a support role at a university, usually while completing postgraduate education. The assistant typically helps professors with instructional responsibilities as teaching assistants or with academic research responsibilities as research assistants, aids coaches with an athletic team, or is employed by other university departments (such as housing or academic advising).

Rather than receive hourly wages, GAs are often remunerated in the form of a stipend, a fixed sum of money paid periodically for services or to defray expenses. This allows the graduate student to focus on their studies instead of a full-time job, but only pays a portion of the income of a full-time job. A PhD graduate stipend is considered income in the United States. The fact remuneration is termed a "fee" or "stipend" rather than salary or wages is immaterial.

Assistantships provide experience for graduate students, increasing their future employment options. This is especially true in U.S. college sports, in which a graduate assistant position is very often the first step on a coach's career ladder.

Graduate assistantships are beneficial to the employing university as well because graduate assistants fill positions that would cost the university significantly more to fill with traditional employees.

== See also ==
- Graduate student
